Abakanovo is the name of several rural localities in Russia:
Abakanovo, Tver Oblast, a village in Toropatskoye Rural Settlement of Andreapolsky District of Tver Oblast; 
Abakanovo, Cherepovetsky District, Vologda Oblast, a selo in Abakanovsky Selsoviet of Cherepovetsky District of Vologda Oblast; 
Abakanovo, Kaduysky District, Vologda Oblast, a village in Nikolskoye Rural Settlement of Kaduysky District of Vologda Oblast; 
Abakanovo, Vologodsky District, Vologda Oblast, a village in Semenkovsky Selsoviet of Vologodsky District of Vologda Oblast;